The Football League Group Cup was a football competition which took place during the 1981–82 and 1982-83 seasons. The competition was for English clubs as a replacement for the Anglo-Scottish Cup, which had been discontinued after the withdrawal of Scottish League clubs. The name Football League Group Cup was used in the 1981-82 season with the name Football League Trophy used in 1982-83.

In the 1983-84 season the competition was reformatted to the Associate Members' Cup.

Format
In each season there were 32 participants, split into eight regional groups of four teams each, with three round-robin games played by each side. The eight group winners qualified for the quarter-finals, and the knockout stages were played as a single leg, with the game going to extra time and penalties if necessary. The final was played on the home ground of one of the two teams.

1981–82

Participants
The following 32 sides played in the competition, and these are sub-divided according to the League division they played in that season.
Football League First Division: Notts County
Football League Second Division: Bolton Wanderers, Grimsby Town, Norwich City, Orient, Rotherham United, Shrewsbury Town, Watford (7 teams)
Football League Third Division: Burnley, Carlisle United, Chester, Chesterfield, Doncaster Rovers, Gillingham, Lincoln City, Newport County, Oxford United, Plymouth Argyle, Preston North End, Reading, Southend United, Wimbledon (14)
Football League Fourth Division: AFC Bournemouth, Aldershot, Blackpool, Bradford City, Bury, Hartlepool United, Hull City, Peterborough United, Sheffield United, Torquay United (10)

The tournament was won by Grimsby Town, who defeated Wimbledon 3–2 in the final at Blundell Park on Tuesday 6 April 1982.

1982–83

Participants
The following 32 sides played in the competition, and these are sub-divided according to the League division they played in that season.
Football League First Division: Norwich City, Watford
Football League Second Division: Crystal Palace, Grimsby Town, Shrewsbury Town
Football League Third Division: AFC Bournemouth, Bradford City, Brentford, Chesterfield, Exeter City, Lincoln City, Millwall, Newport County, Orient, Oxford United, Reading, Sheffield United, Southend United (13 teams)
Football League Fourth Division: Aldershot, Bristol City, Chester, Colchester United, Halifax Town, Hartlepool United, Hull City, Mansfield Town, Northampton Town, Peterborough United, Scunthorpe United, Torquay United, Tranmere Rovers, Wimbledon (14)

Final

The tournament was won by Millwall, who defeated Lincoln City 3–2 in the final at Sincil Bank on Wednesday 20 April 1983.

Millwall line-ups

References

 
Defunct football cup competitions in England
EFL Trophy
Defunct English Football League competitions
1981 establishments in England
Recurring sporting events established in 1981